The 2021 Louisiana Tech Bulldogs baseball team represented Louisiana Tech University in the sport of baseball for the 2021 college baseball season. The Bulldogs competed in Division I of the National Collegiate Athletic Association (NCAA) and in Conference USA West Division. They played their home games at J. C. Love Field at Pat Patterson Park, on the university's Ruston campus. The team was coached by Lane Burroughs, who was in his fifth season with the Bulldogs.

Preseason

Preseason All-American teams
3rd Team
Parker Bates – Outfilder (Collegiate Baseball)

C-USA media poll
The Conference USA preseason poll was released on February 11, 2021 with the Bulldogs predicted to finish in second place in the West Division.

Preseason CUSA Player of the Year
Parker Bates – Senior, Outfielder

Preseason All-CUSA team
Hunter Wells – Infielder
Taylor Young – Infielder
Parker Bates – Outfielder

Schedule and results

Schedule Source:
*Rankings are based on the team's current ranking in the D1Baseball poll.

Rankings

References

External links
•	Louisiana Tech Baseball

Louisiana Tech
Louisiana Tech Bulldogs baseball seasons
Louisiana Tech Bulldogs baseball
Louisiana Tech